"Never Forget" is a song recorded by English boy band Take That, included as the sixth track on their third studio album, Nobody Else (1995). Written by Gary Barlow, it features Howard Donald on lead vocals. The song was released on 24 July 1995 and became the band's seventh number one on the UK Singles Chart, remaining at number one for three weeks. Robbie Williams left the band during the promotion of the song.

Song information
The song was written by Gary Barlow and sung mostly by Howard Donald. Robbie Williams has a short solo section in the middle of the song and his vocals are also featured before the final chorus. 

Courtesy of a remix by producer Jim Steinman, the single version contains heavier, more robust instrumentation, with brass arrangements and additional vocals from the Henllan Boys Choir. It also features a short instrumental intro taken from Verdi's Requiem.

The song was mimed by the leading characters in the series finale in the fourth series of Shameless and used in 2006 for the "Take That: The Ultimate Tour" finale. Currently the track has sold over 600,000 copies in the UK and received a Platinum certification.

"Sunday to Saturday" was issued as a single in Japan instead of "Never Forget" and reached number nine. However, "Never Forget" still managed to chart in the lower sections of its singles chart.

Critical reception
In his weekly UK chart commentary in Dotmusic, James Masterton wrote that what has transformed "a rather weedy-sounding album track" into "a bombastic masterpiece" is the credit on the sleeve which indicates the remixing presence on the track of one Jim Steinman. Pan-European magazine Music & Media said, "Exit Robbie, welcome to the now fab four. Recorded before his departure, the title and the lyrics seem almost to have anticipated his announcement. Jim Steinman's trademark bombastic production underlines the drama." A reviewer from Music Week commented, "The likes of Clive Griffin, Katie Kissoon and Jimmy Ruffin's son Jayray provide the choral backing for this slinky, rousing pop track that grows with a piano and strings accompaniment before a great hand clapping finale." In the magazine's single review, they rated it four out of five, adding, "A fanfare and a heavenly choir precede this strong gospel tinged number with Howard Donald on lead vocals. It should see the boys grabbing the top spot once more."

Some have noticed similarities between the track's chorus and that of Smokey Robinsons' 1965 "Tracks of My Tears". The link to Robinson is also shown in a duet between Barlow and Robinson which features on the 2014 album Smokey & Friends.

In 2018, the song was ranked seventy first by Billboard critics in their compilation of the 100 Greatest Boyband Songs of All Time.

Music video
The accompanying music video for the song was directed by David Amphlett. It is a montage of childhood moments of Take That caught on camera and features photographs of the members as children. Most of the footage is taken from the band performing live, backstage at gigs or on tour. Other moments such as the band meeting Prince Charles and TV appearances are also shown. The video for "Never Forget" was later published on Take That's official YouTube channel in October 2009. It has amassed more than 9.4 million views as of September 2021.

Live performances
In the original recording of the song, Robbie Williams had a solo section near the end. When the group reformed in 2006 without him, the first part of Williams' section was sometimes sung by whoever was supporting the band on tour. The second half was sung by Mark Owen. After Williams rejoined the group in 2010, the song was performed live by all five members for the first time on the BBC's Children in Need on 19 November 2010. In 2008, Eoghan Quigg performed a cover of this song on The X Factor and it featured on his critically panned self-titled album, released on 6 April 2009. Critics considered it the worst moment on the album. The following year it was performed by the final twelve during the final group performance of series 6. It was also performed at the beginning of The X Factor Final 2010 featuring finalists Matt Cardle, Rebecca Ferguson and One Direction, and joined by Take That on stage.

Williams also performed the song solo, on the Take the Crown Stadium Tour in 2013. When playing at Wembley Stadium, he replaced the lyric "Someday this will all be someone else's dream" with "this will be Justin Bieber's dream..." and continued, "I don't think so! He's a good singer and he's got a lovely haircut... I should shut up now before I get into too much trouble," to thunderous applause from the audience.

Williams performed the song on his 2017 stadium tour The Heavy Entertainment Show Tour.

The song's chorus is played during rugby games at Twickenham Stadium when England score a penalty kick or conversion.

On 25 March 2017, the three remaining members of Take That performed "Never Forget" with Ant & Dec as the final song of a medley during the "End of the Show Show" on Ant & Dec's Saturday Night Takeaway.

Track listings

 UK CD single #1 (74321 29956 2)
 "Never Forget" (radio edit) – 5:32
 "Back For Good" (live From MTV's Most Wanted) – 4:10
 "Babe" (live from MTV's Most Wanted) – 4:41

 UK CD single #2 (74321 29957 2)
 "Never Forget" (single mix) – 6:24
 "Pray" (live from MTV's Most Wanted) / Interview – 17:36

 EU CD single #1 (74321 29842 2)
 "Never Forget" (radio edit) – 5:32
 "Back For Good" (live from MTV's Most Wanted) – 4:10

 EU CD single #2 (74321 29843 2)
 "Never Forget" (radio edit) – 5:32
 "Back For Good" (live from MTV's "Most Wanted) – 4:10
 "Pray" (live from MTV's Most Wanted) / Interview – 17:36

 Japanese CD single (BVCP 1302)
 "Sunday to Saturday" – 5:03
 "Back for Good" (live from MTV's Most Wanted) – 4:10
 "Babe" (live from MTV's Most Wanted) – 4:41
 "Pray" (live from MTV's Most Wanted) / Interview – 17:36

 UK Cassette single (74321 29959 2)
 "Never Forget" (radio edit) – 5:32
 "Back For Good" (live from MTV's Most Wanted) – 4:10

 UK 7" vinyl - Jukebox release only (74321 29960 2)
 "Never Forget" (radio edit) – 5:32
 "Back for Good" (live from MTV's Most Wanted) – 4:10

Official versions
 Album version (5:13)
 Single mix radio edit (5:32)
 Single mix (6:24)
 Live at the Manchester Nynex (7:32)
 Live at Wembley (5:28)
 Odyssey Mix (5:25)
 Live at Cardiff Principality Stadium (5:28)

Charts and certifications

Weekly charts

Year-end charts

Certifications

Personnel
Howard Donald – co-lead vocals
Gary Barlow – co-lead vocals, backing vocals
Jason Orange – co-lead vocals, backing vocals
Mark Owen – co-lead vocals, backing vocals
Robbie Williams – co-lead vocals, backing vocals

See also

"The Official BBC Children in Need Medley"

References

1995 songs
1995 singles
Irish Singles Chart number-one singles
Number-one singles in Scotland
UK Singles Chart number-one singles
Take That songs
Songs written by Gary Barlow
Song recordings produced by Jim Steinman
Number-one singles in Spain
Song recordings with Wall of Sound arrangements